The North Sydney Olympic Pool is a swimming and exercise complex located adjacent to Sydney Harbour at Milsons Point between the Sydney Harbour Bridge and Luna Park.

Designed by architects Rudder & Grout in the Inter-War Free Classical style with art deco-style decorations, the Olympic-sized outdoor pool was built on part of the Dorman Long workshops site following the completion of the Harbour Bridge. The pool opened 4 April 1936 and hosted the swimming and diving events for the 1938 Empire Games. Heating was added in 2000 and a  indoor pool was added in 2001.

Eighty-six world records have been set at the pool by such swimming greats as, for example, Jon Konrads and Ilsa Konrads, Lorraine Crapp, Frank O'Neill, Judy Joy Davies, John Devitt, Shane Gould and Michelle Ford.

In 1960, at the Australian National Swimming Championships and Olympic Trials, the most world records were set in the one pool at the one meet ever.

It closed on 28 February 2021 to allow for construction of a replacement pool and associated buildings. It is scheduled to reopen in 2023.

References

External links

Sports venues in Sydney
Swimming venues in Australia
Stadiums of the Commonwealth Games
1936 establishments in Australia
Sports venues completed in 1936
Commonwealth Games swimming venues
Milsons Point, New South Wales
Art Deco architecture in Sydney
North Sydney Council